Arthur Carl Wilhelm Heffter (15 June 1859, in Leipzig – 8 February 1925, in Berlin) was a German pharmacologist and chemist.  He was the first chairman of the German Society of Pharmacologists, and was largely responsible for the first Handbook of Experimental Pharmacology.  He isolated mescaline from the peyote cactus in 1897, the first such isolation of a naturally occurring psychedelic substance in pure form.  In addition, he conducted experiments on its effects by comparing the effects of peyote and mescaline on himself.

Works
 Die chronische Bleivergiftung im Maler-Gewerbe. [S.l.] 1903 Digital edition by the University and State Library Düsseldorf.
 Die Auffindung von Arzneimitteln. Hirschwald, Berlin 1914 Digital edition by the University and State Library Düsseldorf.

See also 
 Heffter Research Institute

References

External links 
 About: Dr. Arthur Heffter
 Arthur Heffter, Deutschland Databank
 Arthur Heffter, German Digital Register
 "Dr. Arthur Heffter" – The Heffter Institute Website
 
 

German pharmacologists
1859 births
1925 deaths
Psychedelic drug researchers
Psychedelic drug advocates